The first USSR stamps or First All-Russia Agricultural Exhibition issue appeared in August 1923 as a series of Soviet Union postage stamps. Its designer was the Russian artist Georgy Pashkov.

History 
The First All-Russian Agricultural and Handicraft Exhibition was held in Moscow in 1923. It was opened on 19 August. This very day, a special commemorative series of postage stamps dedicated to the exhibition opening was released. These were the first stamps of the Soviet Union.

Stamps 
The stamp design was created by the artist G. Pashkov.

They were produced by lithographic printing in two versions, imperforate and perforated.

See also

References

Further reading

External links 
 

Postage stamps of the Soviet Union
1923 introductions
Exhibitions in Russia